Al-Ma'mun is an Arabic name. Its meaning is 'trustworthy', 'trusted', 'reliable'.

 Al-Ma'mun may refer to
Al-Ma'mun (born 786 – died 833), 9th-century famous Abbasid Caliph reigned from 813 to 7 August 833. He was the most famous bearer of this name.
Ma'mun I ibn Muhammad (died 997), Khwarazmshah
Ma'mun II (died 1017), Khwarazmshah
al-Ma'mun al-Bata'ihi (died 1125), vizier to the Fatimid caliph al-Amir bi-Ahkami'l-Lah.
al-Mamun of Toledo (died 1075), Taifa king and a member of the Banu Dil-Nun dynasty.
Idris al-Ma'mun (died 1232), was the Rival Almohad ruler who reigned in part of the Empire from 1229 until his death.